Ski jumping at the 1984 Winter Olympics consisted of two events held from 12 February to 18 February, taking place at Igman Olympic Jumps.

Medal summary

Medal table

Finland led the medal table with three medals, one of each type.

Events

Participating NOCs
Seventeen nations participated in ski jumping at the Sarajevo Games.

References

 
1984 Winter Olympics events
1984
1984 in ski jumping
Ski jumping competitions in Yugoslavia